ADN may refer to:

Technology
 Application Delivery Network, a suite of technologies for improved delivery of applications across the Internet
 Aircraft Data Network, a proposed network standard for commercial aircraft installations
 Abbreviated Dialing Numbers, two or three digits sequence to reach specific telephone numbers, such as those of public services
 App.net, an online social networking service
 Digital Negative (file format), a raw image format designed by Adobe Systems

Science
Ammonium dinitramide, a rocket propellant
DNA, as abbreviated in various languages (particularly Romance languages such as Spanish and French)
Auditory Disability with Normal hearing, a term for King-Kopetzky syndrome
Adiponitrile

Politics
 Nationalist Democratic Action, a political party of Bolivia
 National Democratic Alliance (Italy), a former political party of Italy

Media
 ADN (newspaper), a Spanish free daily newspaper
, the state news agency of East Germany
Anchorage Daily News, an Alaskan newspaper
ADN, the original French title of DNA, a 2020 drama film
 ADN Radio Chile, a Chilean Radio station

Education
 Associate Degree in Nursing, similar to Associate of Science in Nursing
 A common term for the student section of Athens Drive High School

Other uses
 Abbreviated dialing number
 ADN , the stock symbol of Aberdeen Asset Management
 Adang language, a Trans-New Guinea language of Indonesia
 Ardrossan Town railway station, UK
 Ashley, Drew and Northern Railway, a defunct railroad in Arkansas
 Andes Airport in Andes, Antioquia, Colombia
 European Agreement concerning the International Carriage of Dangerous Goods by Inland Waterways, part of the UN Recommendations on the Transport of Dangerous Goods